Dela (d. c. 894), count of Empúries (862–894), was the son of Sunyer I of Empúries, whom he succeeded along with his brother, Sunyer II of Empúries, in 862.  

The brothers tried to conquer the county of Girona, but their relative, Wilfred the Hairy, halted their advances.  

He married Sixilona, daughter of Sunifred I, Count of Barcelona, and they had the following children:

Ramló (d. 960), abbot of Saint John of Ripoll
Virgilia (d. 957)

890s deaths
Counts of Empúries
Year of birth unknown
9th-century rulers in Europe
9th-century Visigothic people